Oussama Darfalou (born 29 September 1993) is an Algerian professional footballer who plays as a forward for Eredivisie club Emmen and the Algeria national team.

Club career

RC Arbaâ
Coming from USM Alger Reserve team, Oussama Darfalou spent his first professional contract with RC Arbaâ. On 16 August 2014, he made his debut for the team in the Ligue 1 against USM El Harrach as a starter and scored the winning goal. In that season Darfalou participated in all the matches in Ligue 1 and scored 12 goals, in the Algerian Cup from 6 games scored two goals and managed to lead his team to the final for the first time where they defeated against MO Béjaïa.

USM Alger
In June 2015, Darfalou was loaned out by RC Arbaâ to USM Alger for the 2015–16 season. but later USM Alger bought the player's contract and went on for three seasons, he made his debut for the team in the Ligue 1 against USM Blida as a substitute in 1–0 loss. Later Darfalou scored his first goal with the club against his former club RC Arbaâ in 4–0 victory. Darfalou suffered several injuries during the season and played only 13 games and scored four goals in all competitions, and despite that and in his first season achieved the first title in his professional career by winning the league title.

The following season improved the player's return despite suffering injuries on several occasions risked keep him out of play for nearly two months. However, he participated in 28 matches and scored 12 goals in all competitions, and in the first match of the season against MO Béjaïa scored a goal, as for his first goal in continental competitions was against Rail Club du Kadiogo in CAF Champions League in 2–0 victory. Later, he scored three goals in the same competition. That season Darfalou also achieved his second title, the Super Cup, although he did not participate because of injury. Finally, in the last game of the Ligue 1, Darfalou scored his first hat-trick in his career against JS Saoura.

The 2017–18 season was full of contrast for Darfalou. While from a collective point of view, his club, USM Alger, realized an average course finishing sixth in the standings and not winning any trophy, the striker succeeded in registering 24 goals in 38 games in all competitions. He distinguished himself by claiming the title of top scorer in the Algerian league with 18 goals in 27 games. At the end of the contract at the USMA at the end of the season, Darfalou decided not to remain at the Rouge et Noir and received solicitations from European clubs. It is first announced in Switzerland, Grasshopper Club Zürich, then in Germany, Hamburger SV. however, The HSV leaders, denied any contact with the player on 23 May 2018.

Vitesse
On 6 June 2018, Darfalou signed for Vitesse of the Eredivisie for four seasons to become the third Algerian to play there. He made his debut for the team in the Eredivisie as a substitute during a win against Groningen, later in the KNVB Cup Darfalou scored his first goal against RKAV Volendam in 2–1 victory. On 7 October he was in the starting line-up for the first time in the Eredivisie after his teammate Tim Matavž was injured, scoring a brace to lead Vitesse to win 4–0 at GelreDome against Heracles Almelo.

Loan to PEC Zwolle
On 3 January 2022, Darfalou joined PEC Zwolle on loan until the end of the season.

Maghreb de Fès
On 25 August 2022, Darfalou signed a two-year contract with Maghreb de Fès in Morocco.

International career
In October 2018, Darfalou was called up by Djamel Belmadi for the first time for a 2019 Africa Cup of Nations qualifier against Benin as a replacement for his injured Islam Slimani.

Career statistics

Club

International goals
Scores and results list Algeria's goal tally first, score column indicates score after each Darfalou goal.

Honours
USM Alger
 Algerian Ligue Professionnelle 1: 2015–16
 Algerian Super Cup: 2016

Individual
 Algerian Ligue Professionnelle 1 top scorer: 2017–18

References

External links
 
 

1993 births
Living people
People from M'Sila Province
Association football forwards
Algerian footballers
Algeria under-23 international footballers
Algerian Ligue Professionnelle 1 players
Eredivisie players
RC Arbaâ players
USM Alger players
Amal Bou Saâda players
ES Sétif players
SBV Vitesse players
VVV-Venlo players
PEC Zwolle players
Maghreb de Fès players
FC Emmen players
Algerian expatriate footballers
Expatriate footballers in the Netherlands
Algerian expatriate sportspeople in the Netherlands
Expatriate footballers in Morocco
Algerian expatriate sportspeople in Morocco
2015 Africa U-23 Cup of Nations players
Footballers at the 2016 Summer Olympics
Olympic footballers of Algeria
Algeria international footballers
21st-century Algerian people